Compensator can refer to:

 Pressure control on a piston pump
 An alternative term for pipeline expansion joints
 A muzzle brake, used to counter the recoil of a firearm, or to prevent the muzzle from climbing due to kickback from the rapid firing of an automatic or semi-automatic weapon
 A device that offsets or counterbalances a destabilising factor: See 
Buoyancy compensator (diving)
Buoyancy compensator (aviation)
Static VAR compensator
Heisenberg compensator, key part of a Transporter (Star Trek)
Lead-lag compensator
 Motion compensator
 Optical compensator, also known as a wave plate or a retarder
 another term for the dual-predictable projection of a Point process
 Compensator (Control Theory)